Steve Hardy is an Australian former professional rugby league footballer who played in the 1980s and 1990s. He played for Eastern Suburbs and Cronulla-Sutherland in the NSWRL competition.

Playing career
Hardy made his first grade debut for Cronulla in round 2 of the 1982 NSWRFL season against Penrith at Penrith Park. Hardy played a total of 24 games for Cronulla over two seasons before signing with Eastern Suburbs. Hardy would go on to play 100 matches for Easts over the next eight years. Hardy went his entire career without playing a single finals game.

References

Sydney Roosters players
Cronulla-Sutherland Sharks players
1961 births
Australian rugby league players
Rugby league second-rows
Rugby league locks
Living people